The Buffy the Vampire Slayer Roleplaying Game (BtVSRPG) is a role-playing game published by Eden Studios, Inc. in 2002.  It is based on the popular television series Buffy the Vampire Slayer that ran from 1997-2003.  The BtVPSRPG uses the Unisystem game engine that many of Eden's games used.

Books and products
There are six available titles in the Buffy the Vampire Slayer Role-playing Game product line. In order of release, these are:

BtVSRPG: Core Rulebook
() The Core Rulebook provides an introduction to the setting, characters and rules. The book is broken down into discrete sections which describe the mechanics and style of the game in a clear and concise manner, so as to appeal to both new gamers and experienced gamers, as well as fans of the show. The text is frequently informal and tongue-in-cheek, in keeping with the general feel of the series itself.

The book includes a series appendices, which describe the unique dialogue and slang used on the show, lay out the differences between the Classic and Cinematic Unisystem rules, provide charts and summaries of the more important concepts, and finally offer a full glossary and index.

The Core Rulebook was initially released alongside a Limited Edition which featured a cream-colored leatherette color, red foil Buffy logo, and red cloth bookmark. Only 1000 copies of this edition were produced. In 2005, Eden Studios released the Revised Core Rulebook which incorporates existing errata into the book, updates some rules to bring the Buffy RPG more in line with the Angel Roleplaying Game, and expands upon the material provided in the original Core Rulebook, providing updated characters and adversaries for the sixth and seventh seasons of the series.

BtVSRPG: Slayer's Handbook
() The first supplement for the BtVSRPG, the Slayer's Handbook features - as the title would imply - an expanded look at the possible backgrounds and major life events unique to Slayers, and includes such additions as the Slayer-in-Training Quality, which represents Slayers such as Kendra Young who were able to receive training before their calling. However, it also goes on to provide a number of new Qualities, Drawbacks, weapons, archetypes, and more. Aside from the new perspective on Slayers, the book may be most famous among fans for its expansion into alternate settings, offering a number of suggestions on setting a game in different time periods, locations and even parallel realities. Three complete settings exploring these themes are provided within the book. Finally, the Slayer's Handbook includes "The Chosen Two," an adventure which can be used to continue the Djinn Season.

The Slayer's Handbook was also published alongside a Limited Edition, which featured a blue leatherette cover, red foil "Slayer" graphic, and red cloth bookmark.

The name Slayer's Handbook is a double reference.  In the Buffyverse, the watchers have a book for slayers referred to as the Slayer's Handbook (Giles didn't think Buffy would learn well from a book and so did not use it in training her).  It is also an homage to Player's Handbook, the core book of Dungeons & Dragons, one of the first role playing games.

BtVSRPG: Monster Smackdown
() The BtVS equivalent of a Monster Manual, this supplement explores vampires, demons, and other adversaries in greater depth, providing an expanded and updated collection of villains and elaborating upon a number of supernatural abilities. It also introduces a few more supernatural creatures as possible player characters - notably the Troll, as defined within the Buffyverse. Like the previous books in this line, Monster Smackdown includes a Djinn Season episode, "The Once and Future HST," which plays with events from the series as well as mythological elements.

Like the Core Rulebook and Slayer's Handbook, Monster Smackdown was published alongside a Limited Edition which featured a black leatherette cover, red foil "Evil" graphic, and red cloth bookmark.

BtVSRPG: Director's Screen
( ) While the main component of this accessory is a four-panel cardstock screen, designed to shield notes and other sensitive information from the eyes of players while providing quick reference charts to the Director, the Director's Screen comes shrinkwrapped with a 56-page booklet offering a number of Directing tips as well as three pregenerated adventures for the Djinn Season.

BtVSRPG: The Magic Box
() As implied by the title, this supplement offers an expanded ruleset for magic spells and spellcasters; however, it also provides a number of new mystical and psychic abilities, new Qualities and Drawbacks, and expands the magical milieu of the game to include Enchanters (who create blessed swords, lightning-throwing gauntlets and other such items) and Superscientists (such as Warren Mears). This supplement also includes an adventure, "Orphan Trouble," which does not necessarily connect to the Djinn Season, but can be modified to fit within that story arc. Released as a softcover, The Magic Box did not receive the Limited Edition treatment.

BtVSRPG: Character Journal
() Designed as an expanded version of the character sheet already provided for the game, the Character Journal is a 16-page booklet providing a great deal of space for a single character's statistics, background, experience gains and expenditures, and even notable achievements. It is the only BtVSRPG product which does not include a pregenerated adventure module.

BtVSRPG: Welcome to Sunnydale
() Originally solicited for 2003, this supplement was never released. Eden Studios lost the Buffy franchise in October 2006, and with the franchise went this supplement. Welcome to Sunnydale was supposed to include historical and geographical information regarding the setting of the series, expanded descriptions of recurring characters, suggestions on setting series in Sunnydale at various points in the town's history, and a pregenerated adventure closely tied to the town.

BtVSRPG: Tea and Crossbows
According to author Phil Masters, he had just submitted a solicited manuscript, a guide to the Watchers called Tea and Crossbows, a few days before the Eden Studios announced the loss of their license.

Canon
The Buffy RPG has already contributed to Buffyverse canon, in that Faith Lehane and Kendra Young's last names were provided by Joss Whedon in response to queries from Eden Studios. These names are now used widely throughout fiction based upon the series.

Reviews
Pyramid

References

Contemporary role-playing games
Eden Studios games
Horror role-playing games
Origins Award winners
Role-playing games based on television series
Role-playing games introduced in 2002
Vampires in games
Works based on Buffy the Vampire Slayer